Dog House is a Canadian comedy television series broadcast by YTV in the 1990–91 season.

Premise
During a car accident, a police detective's mind is swapped with the mind of Digby, his St Bernard dog partner on duty. Helen Underwood (Shelley Peterson), the officer's widowed sister-in-law, takes custody of Digby where he joins her children Annabelle (Valentina Cardinalli), Richie (Jaimz Woolvett) and Timmy (Jonathan Shapiro). Now inhabiting Digby's body, the detective is able to talk with the family.

Episodes
 "Pilot"
 "Speak Digby Speak"
 "The Furniture Show"
 "Lost and Found"
 "Going, Going, Gone"
 "A Dog and His Bone"
 "The Amazing Annabelle"
 "Cyrano Show"
 "Ted Moves In"
 "Helen's Date"
 "Camp Out"
 "Coming of Age"
 "Rear Window"
 "Ted Meats His Match"
 "Spot Marks the Ex"
 "A Matter of Trust"
 "Dog Day Glickman"
 "Uncle Digby's History"
 "Obedience School"
 "Iris's Cookies"
 "Fear of Flying"
 "Eye on Clearview"
 "Risky Business"
 "Digby's Secret"
 "Bachelor #3"
 "Rentsok"

Former Ontario premier David Peterson, whose wife portrayed series character Helen Underwood, appeared in a guest role on the series as a school janitor.

Reception

David Hiltbrand of People panned the series, noting "[t]he humor is very forced. This pooch of a show arrived neutered." Tony Atherton of the Ottawa Citizen also derided the series as "a classically lame-brained TV situation without redeeming values". Greg Quill of the Toronto Star "contains not a whit of original thought nor anything resembling a line worthy of a giggle".

DVD release
On 19 April 2016, Mill Creek Entertainment released Dog House – The Complete Series on DVD in Region 1.

Dog House Reunion
On 1 March 2022, cast and crew members from DOG HOUSE reunited online, their first public appearance together in over three decades, to raise money for Literacy Central Vancouver Island. The reunion, organized by NUTFLAKES, a community-run video store in a church basement in Saskatoon, Saskatchewan, brought together series stars Shelley Peterson, Jaimz Woolvett, and Valentina Cardinalli, along with series regulars Barry Flatman and David Bronstein. Later in the program, production manager Noella Nesoly and animal trainer Mathilde de Cagny joined in.

During the event, participants discussed the unknown whereabouts of original cast member Jonathan Shapiro, the series' only leading actor besides the deceased Bodie (who played the talking dog, and the 'voice of Digby', the late Bruce Johnson), not to attend.

The reunion was precipitated by extensive media coverage, including interviews with DOG HOUSE star Valentina Cardinalli and event organizer Mark Kleiner on CBC Saskatchewan Weekend with Shauna Powers on 27 February 2022, and with Kleiner on CTV News Saskatoon with Jeff Rogstad on 28 Feb 2022.

To honour the reunion, Mayor Leonard Krog signed a mayoral proclamation on 24 February 2022 declaring 1 March 2022 DOG HOUSE DAY in the City of Nanaimo.

References

External links
 
 
 TV Guide - Dog House episode guide

1990 Canadian television series debuts
1991 Canadian television series endings
1990s Canadian teen sitcoms
Television shows about dogs
YTV (Canadian TV channel) original programming
USA Network original programming
Television shows filmed in Toronto
Television series by Corus Entertainment